KBBC (99.7 FM) is a radio station licensed to Tishomingo, Oklahoma, United States. The station is currently owned by Mid-Continental Broadcasting, LLC

History
This station was assigned call sign KBBC on August 15, 2012.

References

External links
997thebuzz.com

BBC
Radio stations established in 2014
2014 establishments in Oklahoma